Greenough Lake is a lake in Carbon County, Montana, in the United States.

Greenough Lake was named for a family of rodeo performers.

See also
List of lakes in Montana

See also
 Alice Greenough Orr

References

Lakes of Montana
Lakes of Carbon County, Montana